Holland Landing Airpark (formerly Hare Field)  is located adjacent to the south end of Holland Landing, Ontario, Canada. The airport is mainly used for training but tenants also offer charter, advertising and sightseeing services. The largest building is a  hangar owned by Silverline Helicopters. The smaller hangar belongs to Future Air.

The  private airfield is being shortlisted as a future home for York Regional Police Air2 helicopter.

The original  grass strip was constructed by Wallace G. Hare in 1956 and a second, shorter  runway was added shortly after. It served as a private airstrip for a handful of local pilots and grew to housing up to 20 private aircraft at its peak.  In 1978, ultralights were becoming popular and two local ultralight companies set up their businesses on Hare Field.

In 2006, Hare Field was sold to Silverline Helicopters and became known as Holland Landing Airpark.

Tenants
 Silverline Helicopters - helicopter training and charters

References

External links
 Silverline Helicopters

Registered aerodromes in Ontario
East Gwillimbury